Dombawela is a village in Sri Lanka. It is located within Central Province and has an elevation of 436 m (1,430 ft).

See also
List of towns in Central Province, Sri Lanka

References

External links

Populated places in Matale District